Sir Philip Edmond Wodehouse  (27 February 1811 – 25 October 1887) was a British colonial administrator.

Biography
Wodehouse was the eldest child of Edmond Wodehouse and his wife and first cousin Lucy Wodehouse. His paternal grandfather Thomas Wodehouse and maternal grandfather Reverend Philip Wodehouse were both younger sons of Sir Armine Wodehouse, 5th Baronet, whose eldest son John Wodehouse, 1st Baron Wodehouse, was the ancestor of the Earls of Kimberley.

Wodehouse entered the Ceylon Civil Service at an early age and later served as superintendent of British Honduras from 1851 to 1854. He then served as Governor of British Guiana from 1854 to 1861, where his unpopular measures (such as imposing a head tax) generated enormous riots that even saw him and his retinue attacked and pelted.

In 1861 he was appointed Governor of the Cape Colony and British High Commissioner for Southern Africa, taking over from Sir George Grey who had been recalled for disobeying Imperial orders. 
His High Commission in southern Africa was initially dominated by the dispute between the neighbouring states of Basutoland and the Orange Free State but, via his arbitration, he managed to bring Basutoland under British control.
His High Commission was also overshadowed, throughout its duration, by a growing movement in the Cape for a degree of independence under a system of "Responsible Government". The local Cape Parliament was elected by a system of multi-racial franchise, but had no executive power. The movement for "responsible government" (a democratically accountable executive) had immense local popularity, fueled by what was perceived to be the ineptitude of British imperial rule. Autocratic and unpopular, Wodehouse fought this growing independence movement throughout his Governorship, even attempting to dismantle the Cape Parliament and bring the Cape back under his direct rule as a Crown Colony. Increasingly despotic, he, in turn, faced increasingly fierce opposition, led by local leader John Molteno, until he was recalled in 1870, amid great local celebration.

He was then Governor of Bombay from 1872 to 1877, when he retired from public life. 
He was made a CB in 1860, a KCB in 1862 and a GCSI in 1876.

Family

Wodehouse married Katherine Mary, daughter of F. J. Templer, in 1833. 
They had one child, Edmond Wodehouse, who became Member of Parliament for Bath. Wodehouse died in October 1887, aged 76. He is buried in Kensal Green Cemetery.

Legacy
Wodehouse Peak, a prominent highpoint in Golden Gate Highlands National Park is named after Philip Wodehouse supposedly due to his suggestion that the border between the Boers and Basotho should follow the Rooiberge range. This suggestion, however, dates from 1845 when Sir Peregrine (Percy) Maitland governed the Cape, well before the 1861 governorship of Wodehouse. Wodehouse presided over the Convention of Aliwal-North which formally established the boundaries of Basotholand.

References

, last edited 12 June 2004.

 
 

 
 

 
 

 
 

Governors of the Cape Colony
1811 births
1887 deaths
Burials at Kensal Green Cemetery
Knights Commander of the Order of the Bath
Knights Grand Commander of the Order of the Star of India
Governors of Bombay
Philip Edmond Wodehouse
Governors of British Honduras
Governors of British Guiana
Members of the Bombay Legislative Council